The David L. Jewell House is a historic house at 48 Grandview Avenue in Quincy, Massachusetts.  The -story wood-frame house was built in 1887 for David Jewell, a mill agent from Suncook, New Hampshire.  The house is one of the most elaborate Queen Anne Victorians on Wollaston Hill, exhibiting a wide variety of decorative shingles, a domed tower, and varied roof and dormer gables.  It has a large sloping front gable, which extends all the way down to the first floor, partially sheltering the elaborately decorated porch.  Its carriage barn, now a garage, is one a small number of such surviving outbuildings in Quincy.

The house was listed on the National Register of Historic Places in 1989.

See also
National Register of Historic Places listings in Quincy, Massachusetts

References

Houses in Quincy, Massachusetts
Queen Anne architecture in Massachusetts
Houses completed in 1887
National Register of Historic Places in Quincy, Massachusetts
Houses on the National Register of Historic Places in Norfolk County, Massachusetts